Music x Road is a commercial mixtape by British rapper Headie One. It was released by Relentless Records on 23 August 2019. It features guest appearances from Dave, Skepta, Stefflon Don, Nav, Lotto Ash, RV, and Krept and Konan. All featured artists are fellow British rappers also, with the exception of Nav, who is Canadian. The mixtape peaked at number 5 on the UK Albums Chart.

Critical reception

Jordan Bassett of NME gave the mixtape 4 out of 5 stars, writing, "what is really impressive about Music x Road is its breadth of sound and ambition." The Guardians Al Horner, who also gave the mixtape 4 out of 5 stars, commented that "Claustrophobia and regret sit like a smog across its entire 45-minute runtime."

Track listing
Songwriting credits adapted from Tidal.

Charts

Certifications

References

External links
 

2019 mixtape albums
Headie One albums